Borderliner is a Norwegian noir crime drama series that involves an Oslo police detective who becomes involved in a suicide investigation while visiting his hometown.  The series first aired on November 2, 2017, in Norway on TV 2 and was released to Netflix on March 6, 2018. It has one season.

Plot
Nikolai Andreassen, a police detective from Oslo, is visiting his home town, near Tista river and Swedish border. He is drawn into the investigation of the suicide of a local man named Tommy Hagen; his co-investigator, Anniken Høygaard-Larsen, from the National Criminal Investigation Service, suspects foul play. Nikolai plants evidence in order to protect his younger brother, Lars, who appears to be implicated, but later discovers the truth behind Hagen's death.

Cast
 Tobias Santelmann as Nikolai Andreassen, a detective from Oslo 
 Ellen Dorrit Petersen as Anniken Høygaard-Larsen, a detective from the National Criminal Investigation Service
 Benjamin Helstad as Lars Andreassen, Nikolai's brother, a local police officer
 Bjørn Skagestad as Hans Olav Andreassen, Lars and Nikolai's father, formerly the local sheriff
 Eivind Sander as Josef Koldberg, owner of a brew pub and real estate developer
 Frode Winther as Bengt Skare, the local sheriff
 Morten Svartveit as Kristoffer Lund
 Stig Henrik Hoff as Sven Lindberg, a high-ranking officer in the National Criminal Investigation Service
 Ellen Birgitte Winther as Marta Hagen
 Ole Christoffer Ertvaag as Ove Dreyer
 Thelma Farnes Ottersen as Milla
 Todd Bishop Monrad Vistven as Erik
 Kim-Henning Nilsen as Tommy Hagen
 Cathrine Hoel Hansen as Matilde
 Frida Stavnes as Katia

Episodes

Reception
Erik Adams of the AV Club considers it a top pick. Meghan O'Keefe of Decider called the series "as dark and atmospheric as Scandi-noir comes, but it’s also elegantly beautiful and extremely tense".

References

External links

2010s Norwegian television series
Norwegian crime television series
Norwegian television series